A sweatshop or sweat factory is a crowded workplace with very poor, socially unacceptable or illegal working conditions. Some illegal working conditions include poor ventilation, little to no breaks, inadequate work space, insufficient lighting, or uncomfortably/dangerously high or low temperatures. The work may be difficult, tiresome, dangerous, climatically challenging or underpaid. Workers in sweatshops may work long hours with unfair wages, regardless of laws mandating overtime pay or a minimum wage; child labor laws may also be violated. Women make up 85 to 90% of sweatshop workers and may be forced by employers to take birth control and routine pregnancy tests to avoid supporting maternity leave or providing health benefits. The Fair Labor Association's "2006 Annual Public Report" inspected factories for FLA compliance in 18 countries including Bangladesh, El Salvador, Colombia, Guatemala, Malaysia, Thailand, Tunisia, Turkey, China, India, Vietnam, Honduras, Indonesia, Brazil, Mexico, and the US. The U.S. Department of Labor's "2015 Findings on the Worst Forms of Child Labor" found that "18 countries did not meet the International Labour Organization's recommendation for an adequate number of inspectors."

Use of the term
The phrase sweatshop was coined in 1850, meaning a factory or workshop where workers are treated unfairly, for example having low wages, working long hours, and in poor conditions. Since 1850, immigrants have been flocking to work at sweatshops in cities like London and New York for more than one century. Many of them worked in tiny, stuffy rooms that are prone to fire hazards and rat infestations. The term sweatshop was used in Charles Kingsley's Cheap Clothes and Nasty (1850) describing such workplaces create a ‘sweating system’ of workers. The idea of minimum wage and Labour's union was not developed until the 1890s. This issue appears to be solved by some anti-sweatshop organizations. However, the ongoing development of the issue is showing a different situation. The phrase is still used in current times due to the fact that it is still used in a variety of countries around the world.

History

19th and early 20th centuries

Many workplaces through history have been crowded, low-paying and without job security; but the concept of a sweatshop originated between 1830 and 1850 as a specific type of workshop in which a certain type of middleman, the sweater, directed others in garment making (the process of producing clothing) under arduous conditions. The terms sweater for the middleman and sweat system for the process of subcontracting piecework were used in early critiques like Charles Kingsley's Cheap Clothes and Nasty, written in 1850, which described conditions in London, England. The workplaces created for the sweating system (a system of subcontracting in the tailoring trade) were called sweatshops and might contain only a few workers or as many as 300 and more.

Between 1832 and 1850, sweatshops attracted individuals with lower income to growing cities, and attracted immigrants to locations such as London and New York City's garment district, located near the tenements of New York's Lower East Side. These sweatshops incurred criticism: labor leaders cited them as crowded, poorly ventilated, and prone to fires and rodent infestations: in many cases, there were many workers crowded into small tenement rooms.

In the 1890s, a group calling itself the National Anti-Sweating League was formed in Melbourne and campaigned successfully for a minimum wage via trade boards. A group with the same name campaigned from 1906 in the UK, resulting in the Trade Boards Act 1909.

In 1910, the International Ladies' Garment Workers' Union was founded in attempt to improve the condition of these workers.

Criticism of garment sweatshops became a major force behind workplace safety regulation and labor laws. As some journalists strove to change working conditions, the term sweatshop came to refer to a broader set of workplaces whose conditions were considered inferior. In the United States, investigative journalists, known as muckrakers, wrote exposés of business practices, and progressive politicians campaigned for new laws. Notable exposés of sweatshop conditions include Jacob Riis' photo documentary How the Other Half Lives and Upton Sinclair's book, The Jungle, a fictionalized account of the meat packing industry.

In 1911, negative public perceptions of sweatshops were galvanized by the Triangle Shirtwaist Factory fire in New York City. The pivotal role of this time and place is chronicled at the Lower East Side Tenement Museum, part of the Lower East Side Tenement National Historic Site. While trade unions, minimum wage laws, fire safety codes, and labour laws have made sweatshops (in the original sense) rarer in the developed world, they did not eliminate them, and the term is increasingly associated with factories in the developing world.

Late 20th century to present

In a report issued in 1994, the United States Government Accountability Office found that there were still thousands of sweatshops in the United States, using a definition of a sweatshop as any "employer that violates more than one federal or state labor law governing minimum wage and overtime, child labor, industrial homework, occupational safety and health, workers' compensation, or industry registration". This recent definition eliminates any historical distinction about the role of a middleman or the items produced, and focuses on the legal standards of developed country workplaces. An area of controversy between supporters of outsourcing production to the Third World and the anti-sweatshop movement is whether such standards can or should be applied to the workplaces of the developing world.

Sweatshops are also sometimes implicated in human trafficking when workers have been tricked into starting work without informed consent, or when workers are kept at work through debt bondage or mental duress, all of which are more likely if the workforce is drawn from children or the uneducated rural poor. Because they often exist in places without effective workplace safety or environmental laws, sweatshops sometimes injure their workers or the environment at greater rates than would be acceptable in developed countries.  Penal labor facilities (employing prisoners) may be grouped under the sweatshop label due to underpaid work conditions. 

Sweatshops conditions resemble prison labor in many cases, especially from a commonly found Western perspective. In 2014 Apple was caught "failing to protect its workers" in one of its Pegatron factories. Overwhelmed workers were caught falling asleep during their 12-hour shifts and an undercover reporter had to work 18 days in a row. Sweatshops in question carry characteristics such as compulsory pregnancy tests for female laborers and terrorization from supervisors into submission. Workers then go into a state of forced labor, and if even one day of work is not accounted for could get immediately fired. These working conditions have been the source of suicidal unrest within factories in the past. Chinese sweatshops known to have increased numbers of suicidal employees have suicide nets covering the whole site, in place to stop overworked and stressed employees leaping to their deaths, such as in the case of the Foxconn suicides.

Recently, Boohoo came under light since auditors uncovered large chain of factories in Leicester producing clothes for Boohoo were only paying their workers between £3-4. The conditions of the factories were described as terrible and workers received "illegally low pay".

Child Labor: American History 
Cotton is one of the most important and widely produced crops in the world. However, cotton textiles became the major battlefield on which the political, social, and economic war over child labour was fought. According to the book Child Labor: An American History by Hugh D. Hindman, states, "In 1870, when New England dominated textiles, 13,767, or 14.5 percent of its workforce was children under sixteen". By the most conservative estimate, from the Census of Manufacturers, there were 27,538 under sixteen in southern mills. According to the household census in 1900, the number was 60,000. In response to the issue of child labor, The United States enacted the Fair Labor Standards Acts of 1938 (FLSA) to prohibit the employment of minors under the age of sixteen.

Industries using sweatshop labor
World-famous fashion brands such as H&M, Nike, Adidas and Uniqlo have all been criticized for their use of sweatshops. In 2015, anti-sweatshops protesters marched against the Japanese fast-fashion brand Uniqlo in Hong Kong. Along with the Japanese anti-sweatshops organisation Human Rights Now!, the Hong Kong labour organisation SACOM (Students and Scholars Against Corporate Misbehaviour) protested the "harsh and dangerous" working conditions in Uniqlo's value-added factories in China. According to a recent report published by SACOM, Uniqlo’s suppliers were blamed for "systematically underpaying their labour, forcing them to work excessive hours and subjecting them to unsafe working conditions, which included sewage-covered floors, poor ventilation, and sweltering temperatures". According to the 2016 Clean Clothes Campaign, H&M strategic suppliers in Bangladesh were reported for dangerous working environments, which lacked vital equipment for workers and adequate fire exits.

The German sportswear giant Adidas was criticized for its Indonesian sweatshops in 2000, and accused of underpayment, overtime working, physical abuse and child labour. Another sportswear giant, Nike, faced a heavy wave of anti-sweatshop protests, organised by the United Students Against Sweatshops (USAS) and held in Boston, Washington D.C., Bangalore, and San Pedro Sula. They claimed that workers in Nike's contract factory in Vietnam were suffering from wage theft, verbal abuse and harsh working conditions with "temperatures over the legal limit of 90 degrees". Since the 1990s, Nike was reported to employ sweat factories and child labour. Regardless of its effort to turn things around, Nike's image has been affected by the issue during the past two decades. Nike established an independent department which aimed to improve workers’ livelihoods in 1996. It was renamed the Fair Labor Association in 1999, as a non-profit organisation which includes representatives from companies, human rights organizations, and labour unions to work on the monitoring and management of labour rights. To improve its brand image of being immoral, Nike has been publishing annual sustainable business reports since 2001 and annual corporate social responsibility reports continuously since 2005, mentioning its commitments, standards and audits. Similar stories are still heard in the fashion industry in the past decades. In 2022, brands such as Gap, Disney, Victoria's Secret, Aeropostale to name a few examples, are still using sweatshops. 

In 2016, the United States Department of Labor investigated 77 garment factories in Los Angeles that produced clothing for the aforementioned brands, and found labor violations at 85% of the factories it visited.

Contributing factors

Fast fashion

A trend called "fast fashion" has contributed to the rise of sweatshops. Fast fashion refers to "rapid reorders and new orders that retailers now exert as they discern sales trends in real time" (Ross, 2015) To catch up with the fast-changing fashion trends to satisfy increasing customers’ demand, these fast-fashion brands have to react and arrange production accordingly. To lower production and the storage cost, these brands outsource labour to other countries with low production costs which can produce orders in a short period of time. This results in workers suffering from unreasonably long working hours without reasonable payment. A documentary, "The True Cost" (2015), claims that sweatshops relieve pressure on retailers by passing it to factory owners and, ultimately, workers.

Government corruption and inadequate labour protection legislation
Government corruption and inadequate labour protection legislation in developing countries have also contributed to the suffering of their employees. Weak law enforcement has attracted outside investment in these developing countries, which is a serious problem generating sweatshops. Without reasonable law restrictions, outside investors are able to set up fashion manufacturing plants at a lower cost. According to Zamen (2012), governments in the developing countries often fail to enforce safety standards in local factories because of corruption and weak law enforcement. These weaknesses allow factories to provide dangerous working conditions for their workers. With reference to the Corruption Perception Index 2016 (2017), those countries with high risk of corruption such as Bangladesh, Vietnam, India, Pakistan and China are reported to have larger numbers of unsafe garments factories operating inside the countries. When Zamen (2012) said "corruption kills", sweatshops in developing countries would be the prime cases.

In some places the government or media do not show the full picture. For example, labour camps in Dubai do not have proper conditions for workers. If they protest, they can be deported if they are foreigners.

Low education level
It is suggested that these workers should fight back and protect their own labour rights, yet a lot of them in developing countries are ignorant about their own rights because of low education level. According to the UNESCO Institute of Statistics (2016), most of these sweatshops are located in countries that have low education levels. Harrison, A. & Scorse, J. (2004) mentions that most of the workers do not know about their rights, such as matters about wages and supposed working conditions, thus they have no skill set to fight for their labour rights through collective bargain (such as strike or work to rule). Their lack of knowledge makes it hard for them to improve working conditions on their own.

Impacts of sweatshops

Child labour

Child labour is one of the most serious impacts that sweatshops have brought. According to the International Labour Office, more than 250 million children are employed in sweatshops, of which 170 million of them are engaged in textiles and garments industry in developing countries. In hopes of earning a living, many girls in these countries, such as Bangladesh and India, are willing to work at low wages for long working hours, said Sofie Ovaa, an officer of Stop Child Labour. Most fashion manufacturing chains employ low-skilled labour and as child labour are easier to manage and even more suitable than adult labour for certain jobs such as cotton picking, it becomes a particular problem in sweatshops as they are vulnerable with no backups.

Environmental pollution
Not only workers are impacted by sweatshops, but the neighboring environment as well, through lax environmental laws set up in developing countries to help reduce the production cost of the fashion industry. Clothing manufacturing is still one of the most polluting industries in the world. Nevertheless, the environment of developing countries remained deeply polluted by the untreated waste. The Buriganga River in Bangladesh is now black in colour and pronounced biologically dead because neighbouring leather tanneries are discharging more than 150 cubics of liquid waste daily. (Stanko, 2013) The daily life of local people is significantly affected as Buriganga River is their source of bathing, irrigation and transportation. Many workers in the tanneries suffer from serious skin illness since they are exposed to toxic chemicals for long period of time. Air is being highly polluted in such area because the factories do not install proper ventilation facilities. Sweatshops is also an environmental issue as it is not only causing harm to the human right of labour but also their living environment.

Anti-sweatshop movement

History

19th and early 20th centuries

Some of the earliest sweatshop critics were found in the 19th century abolitionist movement that had originally coalesced in opposition to chattel slavery, and many abolitionists saw similarities between slavery and sweatshop work. As slavery was successively outlawed in industrial countries between 1794 (in France) and 1865 (in the United States), some abolitionists sought to broaden the anti-slavery consensus to include other forms of harsh labor, including sweatshops. As it happened, the first significant law to address sweatshops (the Factory Act of 1833) was passed in the United Kingdom several years after the slave trade (1807) and ownership of slaves (1833) were made illegal.

Ultimately, the abolitionist movement split apart. Some advocates focused on working conditions and found common cause with trade unions and Marxists and socialist political groups, or progressive movement and the muckrakers. Others focused on the continued slave trade and involuntary servitude in the colonial world. For those groups that remained focused on slavery, sweatshops became one of the primary objects of controversy. Workplaces across multiple sectors of the economy were categorized as sweatshops. However, there were fundamental philosophical disagreements about what constituted slavery. Unable to agree on the status of sweatshops, the abolitionists working with the League of Nations and the United Nations ultimately backed away from efforts to define slavery, and focused instead on a common precursor of slavery – human trafficking.

Those focused on working conditions included Friedrich Engels, whose book The Condition of the Working Class in England in 1844 would inspire the Marxist movement named for his collaborator, Karl Marx. In the United Kingdom the first effective Factory Act was introduced in 1833 to help improve the condition of workers by limiting work hours and the use of child labor; but this applied only to textile factories. Later Acts extended protection to factories in other industries, but not until 1867 was there any similar protection for employees in small workshops, and not until 1891 was it possible to effectively enforce the legislation where the workplace was a dwelling (as was often the case for sweatshops). The formation of the International Labour Organization in 1919 under the League of Nations and then the United Nations sought to address the plight of workers the world over. Concern over working conditions as described by muckraker journalists during the Progressive Era in the United States saw the passage of new workers rights laws and ultimately resulted in the Fair Labor Standards Act of 1938, passed during the New Deal.

Late 20th century to present

On February 4, 1997 Mayor Ed Boyle of North Olmsted, in the U.S. state of Ohio, introduced the first piece of legislation prohibiting the government of purchasing, renting, or taking on consignment any and all goods made under sweatshop conditions and including in the definition those goods made by political prisoners and incarcerated criminals. Similar legislation was subsequently passed in other American cities such as Detroit, New York, and San Francisco.  Later Mayor Boyle introduced the legislation to the Mayors and Managers Association where it was immediately endorsed, and he was invited by President Bill Clinton to address a panel studying the subject in Washington, DC.

Clothing and footwear factories overseas have progressively improved working conditions because the high demand of anti-sweatshop movement labor rights advocates. Sweatshops overseas have been receiving enormous amounts of pressure. Around the working conditions from college students, and other opponents of sweatshops which has led to some of the powerful companies like Nike and the Gap who have agreed to cut back on child labour, restrict the use of dangerous and poisonous chemicals, and drop the average rate of employees working 80-hour weeks, according to groups that monitor such factories. Labour advocates say, this could be a major turning point after 4 decades of workers in Asia and Latin American factories being under paid, under appreciated and working in an unsafe environment.

Recently, there have been strides to eradicate sweatshops through government action, for example by increasing the minimum wage. In China, a developing country that is known to be a hub for sweatshops due to relaxed labor laws, high population and low minimum wage, the minimum wage is set to be raised by approximately 7% in 10 provinces by the end of 2018. As well as this governments are also enforcing stricter labor laws such as in 2013 after the collapse of Rana Plaza in Bangladesh, a large 5 storied sweatshops that killed 1135 people due to the building not being up to code, Bangladeshi police shut down many other factories after safety checks were completed and not met. However, no action has been as beneficial to the anti-sweatshop movement as that of the rise of social media. Social media has allowed for the world to see exactly what companies are doing and how they are doing it instantaneously, for free and is distributed to a wide audience. The platforms have allowed for viral videos, hundreds of thousands of retweets of quote's or statistic's, millions of liked and shared pictures etc. to be spread to consumers in regards to companies production methods without any censorship and thus forces brands to be more transparent and ethical with their production practices. This is because a brand's reputation can be completely destroyed by a bystander with a smartphone who records a brand's product being made in a sweatshop where its workers are treated inhumanely. 

However, social media isn’t just helping to expose brands who are using sweatshops and unethical production practices but also is allowing for companies that are trying to increase awareness of the anti-sweatshop movement to spread their message quickly and efficiently. In some cases, it isn't sure that name calling and shaming, is the most effective strategy. Globalization is a big factor on sweatshops within the firm. These leads firms' depend on structural and cultural position. In which many are targeting the leading globalizer and law makers. A solution, that is offered is to combine structural and cultural values, in order to be embedded into policy. That the anti-sweatshop activism states how firms are lacking structural power and cultural vulnerability. For example, in May 2017 Mama Cash and The Clean Clothes Campaign, both organizations that are working towards abolishing sweatshops as well as creating a world of sustainable and ethical apparel practices, worked together to create The Women Power Fashion Pop-up. The event took place in Amsterdam and allowed consumers to sit in a room designed to look and feel like a sweatshop and were forced to create 100 ties in an hour which is synonymous to that of the expectations of women working in sweatshops today. This pop-up allowed consumers to actually experience the life of a sweatshop worker for a limited time period and thus made them more sympathetic to the cause. Outside of the pop-up was a petition that consumers could sign in order to convince brands to be more transparent with their clothing manufacturing processes. The campaign went viral and created a significant buzz for the anti-sweatshop movement as well as the work of Mama Cash and The Clean Clothes Campaign.
In recent years, the notion of the ethical consumer has risen. Consumers not only are important to modern markets but influence the decisions made by companies. These consumers make buying decisions based on how the product was made, by whom and under what conditions, as well as the environmental consequences of production and consumption. This set criteria means that consumption decisions are not only based on ones own personal satisfaction with a purchase but also other aspects such as environmental and the well-being of workers in clothing factories.

Anti-sweatshop organizations
 Clean Clothes Campaign – international alliance of labor unions and non-governmental organizations
 Free the Children – a Canadian organization that helps raise awareness and put a stop to Child Labour – Also helps other children in need
 Global Exchange – an international human rights organization founded in 1988 dedicated to promoting social, economic and environmental justice
 Green America – membership organization based in the United States
 Institute for Global Labour and Human Rights – founded to combat sweatshop labor and US government policy in El Salvador and Central America
 International Labor Rights Fund
 International Labour Organization – a specialized agency of the United Nations
 Maquila Solidarity Network – a Canadian anti-sweatshop network
 No Sweat (UK)
 Rugmark – a carpet labeling program and rehabilitation centers for former child laborers in India, Pakistan and Nepal
 United Students Against Sweatshops – a student organization in the United States and Canada
 Unite Here – a labor union based in the United States and Canada dedicated to achieving higher standards for laborers 
 Worker Rights Consortium – a labor rights organization focused on protecting the rights of workers who make apparel in the United States
 Fair Trade USA -  an independent, nonprofit organization that sets standards, certifies, and labels products that promote sustainable livelihoods for farmers and workers and protect the environment.

In Asia
 China Labour Bulletin – reports on labor concerns in China
 Hong Kong Christian Industrial Committee – empowers workers, acts as a policy watch-dog, and promotes independent trade union movements

Sweatshop-free

Sweatshop-free is a term the fashion brand American Apparel created to mean coercion-free, fair-compensation for garment workers who make their products. American Apparel claims its employees earn on average double the federal minimum wage. They receive a number of employee benefits, from health insurance to subsidized transportation and meals, and have access to an onsite medical clinic. It has been heavily featured in the company's advertisements for nearly a decade and has become a common term in the garment industry.

Debate over the effects of globalization and sweatshops

Criticisms

More recently, the anti-globalization movement has arisen in opposition to corporate globalization, the process by which multinational corporations move their operations overseas to lower costs and increase profits. The anti-sweatshop movement has much in common with the anti-globalization movement. Both consider sweatshops harmful, and both have accused many companies (such as the Walt Disney Company, The Gap, and Nike) of using sweatshops. Some in these movements charge that neoliberal globalization is similar to the sweating system, arguing that there tends to be a "race to the bottom" as multinationals leap from one low-wage country to another searching for lower production costs, in the same way that sweaters would have steered production to the lowest cost sub-contractor.

Various groups support or embody the anti-sweatshop movement today. The National Labor Committee brought sweatshops into the mainstream media in the 1990s when it exposed the use of sweatshop and child labor to sew clothing for Kathie Lee Gifford's Wal-Mart label. United Students Against Sweatshops is active on college campuses. The International Labor Rights Fund filed a lawsuit on behalf of workers in China, Nicaragua, Swaziland, Indonesia, and Bangladesh against Wal-Mart charging the company with knowingly developing purchasing policies particularly relating to price and delivery time that are impossible to meet while following the Wal-Mart code of conduct. Labor unions, such as the AFL–CIO, have helped support the anti-sweatshop movement out of concern both for the welfare of workers in the developing world and those in the United States.

Social critics complain that sweatshop workers often do not earn enough money to buy the products that they make, even though such items are often commonplace goods such as T-shirts, shoes, and toys. In 2003, Honduran garment factory workers were paid US$0.24 for each $50 Sean John sweatshirt, $0.15 for each long-sleeved T-shirt, and only five cents for each short-sleeved shirt – less than one-half of one percent of the retail price. Even comparing international costs of living, the $0.15 that a Honduran worker earned for the long-sleeved T-shirt was equal in purchasing power to $0.50 in the United States. In countries where labor costs are low, bras that cost US$5–7 apiece retail for US$50 or more in American stores. , female garment workers in India earned about US$2.20 per day.

Anti-globalization proponents cite high savings, increased capital investment in developing nations, diversification of their exports and their status as trade ports as the reason for their economic success rather than sweatshops and cite the numerous cases in the East Asian "Tiger Economies" where sweatshops have reduced living standards and wages. They believe that better-paying jobs, increased capital investment and domestic ownership of resources will improve the economies of sub-Saharan Africa rather than sweatshops. They point to good labor standards developing strong manufacturing export sectors in wealthier sub-Saharan countries such as Mauritius.

Anti-globalization organizations argue that the minor gains made by employees of some of these institutions are outweighed by the negative costs such as lowered wages to increase profit margins and that the institutions pay less than the daily expenses of their workers. They also point to the fact that sometimes local jobs offered higher wages before trade liberalization provided tax incentives to allow sweatshops to replace former local unionized jobs. They further contend that sweatshop jobs are not necessarily inevitable. Éric Toussaint claims that quality of life in developing countries was actually higher between 1945 and 1980 before the international debt crisis of 1982 harmed economies in developing countries causing them to turn to IMF and World Bank-organized "structural adjustments" and that unionized jobs pay more than sweatshop ones overall – "several studies of workers producing for US firms in Mexico are instructive: workers at the Aluminum Company of America's Ciudad Acuna plant earn between $21.44 and $24.60 per week, but a weekly basket of basic food items costs $26.87. Mexican GM workers earn enough to buy a pound of apples in 30 minutes of work, while GM workers in the US earn as much in 5 minutes." People critical of sweatshops believe that "free trade agreements" do not truly promote free trade at all but instead seek to protect multinational corporations from competition by local industries (which are sometimes unionized). They believe free trade should only involve reducing tariffs and barriers to entry and that multinational businesses should operate within the laws in the countries they want to do business in rather than seeking immunity from obeying local environmental and labor laws. They believe these conditions are what give rise to sweatshops rather than natural industrialization or economic progression.

In some countries, such as China, it is not uncommon for these institutions to withhold workers' pay.

Furthermore, anti-globalization proponents argue that those in the West who defend sweatshops show double standards by complaining about sweatshop labor conditions in countries considered enemies or hostile by Western governments, while still gladly consuming their exports but complaining about the quality. They contend that multinational jobs should be expected to operate according to international labor and environmental laws and minimum wage standards like businesses in the West do.

Labor historian Erik Loomis claims that the conditions faced by workers in the United States in the Gilded Age have been replicated in developing countries where Western corporations utilize sweatshop labor. In particular, he compares the Triangle Shirtwaist Factory fire in 1911 New York to the collapse of Rana Plaza in 2013 Bangladesh. He argues that the former galvanized the population to political activism that eventually pushed through reforms not only pertaining to workplace safety, but also the minimum wage, the eight-hour day, workers' compensation, Social Security the Clean Air Act, and the Clean Water Act. American corporations responded by shifting production to developing nations where such protections did not exist. Loomis elaborates:

Support
In 1997, economist Jeffrey Sachs said, "My concern is not that there are too many sweatshops, but that there are too few." Sachs and other proponents of free trade and the global movement of capital cite the economic theory of comparative advantage, which states that international trade will, in the long run, make all parties better off. The theory holds that developing countries improve their condition by doing something that they do "better" than industrialized nations (in this case, they charge less but do the same work). Developed countries will also be better off because their workers can shift to jobs that they do better. These are jobs that some economists say usually entail a level of education and training that is exceptionally difficult to obtain in the developing world. Thus, economists like Sachs say, developing countries get factories and jobs that they would not otherwise. Some would say with this situation occurs when developing countries try to increase wages because sweatshops tend to just get moved on to a new state that is more welcoming. This leads to a situation where states often don't try to increase wages for sweatshop workers for fear of losing investment and boosted GDP. However, this only means average wages around the world will increase at a steady rate. A nation only gets left behind if it demands wages higher than the current market price for that labor.

When asked about the working condition in sweatshops, proponents say that although wages and working conditions may appear inferior by the standards of developed nations, they are actually improvements over what the people in developing countries had before. It is said that if jobs in such factories did not improve their workers' standard of living, those workers would not have taken the jobs when they appeared. It is also often pointed out that, unlike in the industrialized world, the sweatshops are not replacing high-paying jobs. Rather, sweatshops offer an improvement over subsistence farming and other back-breaking tasks, or even prostitution, trash picking, or starvation by unemployment.

Sweatshops can mentally and physically affect the workers who work there due to unacceptable conditions which include working long hours. Despite the hardships, sweatshops were a source of income for their workers. The absence of the work opportunities provided by sweatshops can quickly lead to malnourishment or starvation. After the Child Labor Deterrence Act was introduced in the US, an estimated 50,000 children were dismissed from their garment industry jobs in Asia, leaving many to resort to jobs such as "stone-crushing, street hustling, and prostitution". UNICEF's 1997 State of the World's Children study found these alternative jobs "more hazardous and exploitative than garment production". As Nobel prize-winning economist Paul Krugman states in a 1997 article for Slate, "as manufacturing grows in poor countries, it creates a ripple effect that benefits ordinary people: 'The pressure on the land becomes less intense, so rural wages rise; the pool of unemployed urban dwellers always anxious for work shrinks, so factories start to compete with each other for workers, and urban wages also begin to rise.' In time average wages creep up to a level comparable to minimum-wage jobs in the United States."

Writer Johan Norberg, a proponent of market economics, points out an irony:

Heavy-handed responses to reports of child labor and worker rights abuses such as widespread boycotts can be counterproductive if the net effect is simply to eliminate contracts with suppliers rather than to reform their employment practices.  A 2005 article in the Christian Science Monitor states, "For example, in Honduras, the site of the infamous Kathy Lee Gifford sweatshop scandal, the average apparel worker earns $13.10 per day, yet 44 percent of the country's population lives on less than $2 per day... In Cambodia, Haiti, Nicaragua, and Honduras, the average wage paid by a firm accused of being a sweatshop is more than double the average income in that country's economy." On three documented occasions during the 1990s, anti-sweatshop activists in rich countries have apparently caused increases in child prostitution in poor countries. In Bangladesh, the closure of several sweatshops run by a German company put Bangladeshi children out of work, and some ended up working as prostitutes, turning to crime, or starving to death. In Pakistan, several sweatshops closed, including ones run by Nike, Reebok, and other corporations—which caused some of those Pakistani children to turn to prostitution. In Nepal, a carpet manufacturing company closed several sweatshops, resulting in thousands of Nepalese girls turning to prostitution.

A 1996 study of corporate codes of conduct in the apparel industry by the U.S. Department of Labor has concluded that corporate codes of conduct that monitor labor norms in the apparel industry, rather than boycott or eliminate contracts upon the discovery of violations of internationally recognized labor norms, are a more effective way to eliminate child labor and the exploitation of children, provided they provide for effective monitoring that includes the participation of workers and their knowledge of the standards to which their employers are subject.

Arguably, the United States underwent a similar process during its own industrialization where child labor and the suppression of worker organizations were prevalent.  According to an article in Gale Opposing Viewpoints in Context, sweatshops became prevalent in the United States during the Industrial Revolution. Although the working conditions and wages in these factories were very poor, as new jobs in factories began to appear, people left the hard life of farming to work in these factories, and the agricultural nature of the economy shifted into a manufacturing one because of this industrialization. However, during this new industrialized economy, the labor movement drove the rise in the average level of income as factory workers began to demand better wages and working conditions. Through much struggle, sufficient wealth was created and a large middle class began to emerge. Workers and advocates were able to achieve basic rights for workers, which included the right to form unions, and negotiate terms such as wages, overtime pay, health insurance, and retirement pensions; and eventually they were also able to attain legal protections such as minimum wage standards, and discrimination and sexual abuse protections. Furthermore, Congress set forth to ensure a minimum set of safety standards were followed in workplaces by passing the Occupational Safety and Health Act (OSHA) in 1970. These developments were able to improve working environments for Americans but it was through sweatshops that the economy grew and people were able to accumulate wealth and move out of poverty.

In contrast, similar efforts in developing nations have not produced the same results, because of corruption and lack of democracy in communist nations such as China and Vietnam, worker intimidation and murder in Latin America—and corruption throughout the developing world. These barriers prevent creation of similar legal protections for workers in these countries, as numerous studies by the International Labour Organization show. Nonetheless, a boycott approach to protesting these conditions is likely to hurt workers willing to accept employment even under poor working conditions, as a loss of employment would result in a comparatively worse level of poverty. According to a November 2001 BBC article, in the previous two months, 100,000 sweatshop workers in Bangladesh had been put off work. The workers petitioned their government to lobby the U.S. government to repeal its trade barriers on their behalf to retain their jobs.

Defenders of sweatshops cite Hong Kong, Singapore, South Korea, and Taiwan as recent examples of countries that benefited from having sweatshops.

In these countries, legislative and regulatory frameworks to protect and promote labor rights and the rights of workers against unsafe and exploitative working conditions exist, and studies have shown no systematic relationship between labor rights, such as collective bargaining and the freedom of association, and national economic growth.

A major issue for the anti-sweatshop movement is the fate of workers displaced by the closing of sweatshops. Even after escaping the sweatshop industry the workers need a job to sustain themselves and their families. For example, in Bangladesh, a country in which has one of the lowest minimum wages in the world, of $68 per month, the Rana Plaza a known sweatshop that hosted garment factories for retailers such as Primark, JC Penney, Joe Fresh and Benneton, collapsed as it was visibly not structurally sound. After the incident many of the workers were displaced as not only did the Rana Plaza close down but the government also called for safety checks of many factories that were then shut down as a result of not being up to code. Although this may seem like a positive consequence many of those workers were then unable to get jobs and support their families. The garment industry in Bangladesh is worth $28 billion and employs over 160 million people.

See also

References

Further reading
 Bender, Daniel E. Bender and Richard A. Greenwald, eds. Sweatshop USA: The American Sweatshop in Historical and Global Perspective (2003)
 Loomis, Erik. Out of Sight: The Long and Disturbing Story of Corporations Outsourcing Catastrophe. The New Press (2015). 
Powell, Benjamin. 2014. Out of Poverty: Sweatshops in the Global Economy. Cambridge University Press.

External links

 Between a Rock and a Hard Place: A History of American Sweatshops, 1820 – present An online exhibition from the National Museum of American History, Smithsonian Institution
 TV documentary of Europeans living as sweatshop workers in Laos
 “Work Faster or Get Out.” Labor Rights Abuses in Cambodia’s Garment Industry. Human Rights Watch. March 12, 2015.
 ‘When We Made Mistakes in Our Sewing, They Slapped Us’. The Nation. December 21, 2015.
 

Manufacturing
Clothing industry
Ethically disputed working conditions
Clothing controversies
Anti-corporate activism
Economic growth
Economic development
Mass production
Child labour
Penal labour
Contemporary slavery